The National Energy Act of 1978 (NEA78) was a legislative response by the U.S. Congress to the 1973 energy crisis. It includes the following statutes:

 Public Utility Regulatory Policies Act (PURPA)
 Energy Tax Act 
 National Energy Conservation Policy Act (NECPA)
 Power Plant and Industrial Fuel Use Act
 Natural Gas Policy Act

The legislative initiative was introduced by President Carter. The package was a major step in the legislation of the energy field, both the supply and the demand side. The package has soon been followed by Energy Security Act, 8 acts signed by president Carter in 1980. This sequel package addressed energy conservation and development of renewable energy sources.

The NEA78 and the "security" package established a framework for regulatory and market-based initiatives, energy efficiency programs, tax incentives, tax disincentives, energy conservation programs and alternative fuel programs. Most of the market-based mechanisms have been retained in some form to the present, whereas command and control items have been abandoned.

The next major step in energy legislation in the USA was the Energy Policy Act of 1992.

References

United States federal energy legislation
1978 in law